The G20 is an international group of 20 major economies.  The term is also used to refer to any of the G20 summits.

G20 may also refer to:

 G20 developing nations, a trade negotiations bloc of 20+ developing nations
 G20 Research Group at University of Toronto
 BMW 3 Series (G20)
 G20 (inch units) command in G-code
 G20 version of the Infiniti G-series (Q40/Q60) car
 G20 version of the Chevrolet Van
 G20 model of car manufactured by Ginetta Cars
 Ginetta Junior Championship motor racing series formerly G20 Cup
 G20 Schools, an association of secondary schools
 Glock 20, a 10mm Auto pistol
 County Route G20 (California)
 G20 Qingdao–Yinchuan Expressway, in China
 Les XX, a group of twenty Belgian painters, designers and sculptors in 1883
 Bendix G-20, an early Bendix Corporation computer
 Chase XCG-20, an experimental glider tested by the United States Air Force
 Gribovsky G-20 USSR aircraft in mid-1930s
 G-20 version of the Grumman J2F Duck amphibious biplane
 The postcode of the Maryhill district of Glasgow, Scotland

pt:G20